The Mehta Group of Companies, commonly referred to as the Mehta Group, is an Indian conglomerate based in Mumbai and headquartered in Gandhinagar, with subsidiaries in the United States, Canada, Kenya and Uganda. The group employs in excess of 15,000 people worldwide and has an asset base in excess of US$350 million, as of April 2010. The group's businesses include investments in sugar, cement, packaging, floriculture, engineering, electrical cable, consulting, management, insurance, International Trade and International Finance.

History 
The group, founded by Nanji Kalidas Mehta (1887–1969), who was born in India in the late 19th century. In 1900, at the age of 13 years, he migrated to Uganda and started a series of businesses that included a tea plantation, a cotton ginnery, a sugarcane plantation and a sugar factory.

During the 1930s, having established himself in Uganda, Mehta began operations in India. He set up a textile mill and ginning factory in Porbandar, Gujarat, and a trading company in Bombay. Later, a cement plant (Saurashtra Cement Limited) was established in 1956.

In 1972, Idi Amin, then leader of Uganda, expelled all Asians from the country; all of the group's Ugandan possession were surrendered, many to the government-controlled Uganda Development Corporation. The group concentrated on their non-African businesses; setting up a consultancy in India and a plastics plant in Canada becoming a truly International conglomerate during the 1970s. In 1979, Amin was removed from power and the group was invited back into Uganda to repossess their assets.

During the 1980s the Agrima Consultancy wing of the group expanded to Ethiopia, Cameroon, Sudan, Burundi, Nigeria, Nepal, Sri Lanka and Myanmar. The group rehabilitated all their Ugandan businesses during this period. A second cement plant was started in India; the Gujarat Sidhee Cement Limited.

During the 1990s the group entered the financial area by establishing Transafrica Assurance Company Limited. During this period, the cement factories in India were expanded and modernized.

Subsidiary companies 
The companies of the Mehta Group include, but are not limited to the following:
 India
 Saurashtra Cement Limited – Ranavav, Gujarat, India
 Gujarat Sidhee Cement Limited – Sidheegram, Gujarat, India
 Agrima Consultants International Limited – Mumbai, India
 Mehta Private Limited – Mumbai, India
 SRK Knight Riders, India
 Global Cups & Consumables Private Limited – Kandla Port, Gujarat, India.

Uganda
 Transafrica Assurance Company Limited – Kampala, Uganda
 Transafrica Commerce Limited – Kampala, Uganda
 Sugar Corporation of Uganda Limited (SCOUL) – Lugazi, Uganda
 Lugazi Power Station – Lugazi, Uganda
 Ugma Engineering Corporation Limited – Lugazi, Uganda
 Cable Corporation Limited – Lugazi, Uganda
 Uganda Hortech Limited – Lugazi, Uganda

Kenya
 Agro Chemical and Food Company Limited – Muhoroni, Kenya
 The Mehta Group Limited – Nairobi, Kenya
 Glenn Investments Limited Nairobi, Kenya

 USA
 Monarch Plastics Inc. – Kenosha, Wisconsin, United States

See also

References

External links 
 Mehta Group website

Financial services companies established in 1998
Conglomerate companies of India
Manufacturing companies based in Mumbai
Financial services companies based in Mumbai
Manufacturing companies established in 1998
1998 establishments in Maharashtra
Conglomerate companies of Uganda
Conglomerate companies established in 1998